Tiny Creek is a river in the Hudson Bay drainage basin in Northern Manitoba, Canada. It flows from an unnamed lake to the Nelson River, which it enters as a left tributary just after having passed under Manitoba Provincial Road 290.

See also
List of rivers of Manitoba

References

Rivers of Northern Manitoba
Tributaries of Hudson Bay